Sohibnazar (also: Durman) is a village in north-west Tajikistan. It is located in Sughd Region. It is part of the city of Panjakent. The archaeological site of the ancient city of Sarazm is located near the village.

References

Populated places in Sughd Region